The 2014 UC Davis football team represented the University of California, Davis as a member of the Big Sky Conference during the 2014 NCAA Division I FCS football season. Led by second-year head coach Ron Gould, UC Davis compiled an overall record of 2–9 with a mark of 1–7 in conference play, placing last out of 13 teams in the Big Sky. The Aggies played home games at Aggie Stadium in Davis, California.

Schedule

Media
All UC Davis games were carried live on KHTK 1140 AM. All home games and conference road games not being shown as part of the Root Sports game of the week package were carried through the conferences online streaming service Big Sky TV.

References

UC Davis
UC Davis Aggies football seasons
UC Davis Aggies football